Manishada is a 1975 Indian Malayalam-language film, directed and produced by Kunchacko. The film stars Prem Nazir, Srividya, Adoor Bhasi and Sreelatha Namboothiri in the lead roles. The film has musical score by G. Devarajan.

Cast
 
Prem Nazir as Gopi
Srividya as Sumathi
Adoor Bhasi as Moosa
Sreelatha Namboothiri 
T. R. Omana as Karthyayani
Bahadoor as Koya
K. P. Ummer as Kareem
Sumithra as Sainaba
Thikkurissy Sukumaran Nair as Panakkal Ashan
Ushakumari as Jameela
Adoor Bhavani 
Adoor Pankajam as Sathyabhama
Meena as Meenakshi
G. K. Pillai 
Kaduvakulam Antony
Alummoodan as Ouseph
N. Govindankutty as Vikraman
Master Raghu as Young Kareem
Gopi

Soundtrack
The music was composed by G. Devarajan.

References

External links
 

1975 films
1970s Malayalam-language films